The Hiraab is a Somali clan of the larger Hawiye. They are descendants of gorgaarte hawiye. Gorgaarte hawiye is part of six major hawiye clans. Members live in central and southern Somalia, from Galkayo to kismaayo. They are also present in Ethiopia and Kenya. Most of them, such as the Abgaal, Wacdaan,  Habar Gidir ,Duduble and Sheekhaal live in Mogadishu. They once formed a kingdom which successfully revolted and was led by the Abgaal subclan against the Ajuran Sultanate which was another hawiye clan called gambeele and established an independent Hiraab Imamate, which included Hobyo. According to Bernhard Helander of Uppsala University, "the Imam of Hiraab is a hereditary position that traditionally is held by a person of the 
first-born branch, the Mudulood."

Hiraab sub-clans
Ali Jimale Ahmed outlines the Hiraab clan genealogical tree in The Invention of Somalia:
Hiraab.
Mudulood Hiraab
Maxamed Mudulod (udugeen)
Udeejeen Mudulood
Wa'weynte Mudulood
Darandoole Mudulood
Hilibi Darandoole
Isman Darandoole
Wa'dan Isman
Moble'in Isman
Abgaal Isman
Harti
Wa'budhan
Wa'aysle (Warculus)

Madarki'is Hiraab (HabarGidir)
Saruur
Sa'ad
Ayr
Saleban
Mahamuud Hiraab ( Duduble )
Maqalsame 
Arsade
Maxamed camal
Habar awr wadeen
Celi 
Bisin
Qadhoob
Daud
Martiile Hiraab 
Sheekhaal
Sheekhaal Adeer

References

Mudulood Hiraab. daruur.com.

Hawiye clan
Somali clans in Ethiopia